Pucarani (from Aymara Pukarani) is a small town in the La Paz Department in Bolivia. It is the seat of the Pucarani Municipality, the first municipal section of the Los Andes Province and of the province.

See also 
 Laram Quta

References 

 Instituto Nacional de Estadística de Bolivia

Populated places in La Paz Department (Bolivia)